Thomas Maurice "Tom" McLoughlin (born July 19, 1950) is an American screenwriter, film/television director and former mime who is most notable for directing Friday the 13th Part VI: Jason Lives and One Dark Night. His other credits include numerous television films such as Murder in Greenwich, At Risk, Cyber Seduction: His Secret Life, Date with an Angel and the 2010 Lifetime Movie Network film The Wronged Man.

In 1977, McLoughlin was nominated for the Emmy Award for Outstanding Writing for a Variety, Music or Comedy Program for his contributions to Van Dyke and Company, a special starring Dick Van Dyke. Two years later, he portrayed the robot S.T.A.R. (Special Troops/Arms Regiment) in the Disney film The Black Hole. He also played (along with Kevin Peter Hall) Katahdin, the mutated bear in the 1979 horror film Prophecy.

Filmography

Film

Television

Director

References

External links

1950 births
American film directors
American male screenwriters
American television directors
Living people